Maoping is a rural town under the administration of Chengbu Miao Autonomous County, Hunan, China. , it has 5 residential communities and 10 villages under its administration.
The town is bordered to the north by Xiyan Town, to the east by Huangjin Township of Xinning County, to the south by Rulin Town, and to the west by Suining County.

Name
In the Tang dynasty (618–907), the Miao people moved from Xuzhou to Maoping, and changed their surname from "Yang" to "Mao". And named the residence "Maoping", meaning the Mao family's land. "Ping" means a flat piece of land. Later, due to the drought, the area became increasingly barren, Maoping became "Maoping". "Mao" means thatch grass.

Administrative division
As of 2015, the town is divided into 4 communities: the 1st Community, 2nd Community, 3rd Community, Yanzishan Community, and 10 villages: Tonglong, Lianlong, Jinxing, Gaoping, Shuangqiao, Xipenshui, Changle, Dagu, Tuqiao and Qilishan.

Geography
The town is located in the north of Chengbu Miao Autonomous County.

There are three rivers flow through the town, namely the Wushui River, Yuan River and Zi River.

Demographics
In December 2015, the town had an estimated population of 21,000 and a population density of 139 persons per km2. Miao is the dominant ethnic group in the town, accounting for 13,400, or 63.81% of the population. There are 14 ethnic groups represented within the population, including 3,900 Han (18.57%) and 3,600 Dong, Hui and Yao people (17.14%).

Economy
The town's economy is based on nearby natural mineral and agricultural resources. Minerals such as pyrite, lead, zinc, copper, phosphorus, sand, and limestone can be found in the region. Watermelon and citrus are important to the local economy.

Transport
The Provincial Highway S219 passes the town.

References

Bibliography
 

Towns of Hunan
Chengbu Miao Autonomous County